Morriston is a census-designated place (CDP) in Levy County, Florida, United States. The population was 164 at the 2010 census.

Geography
U.S. Route 41 forms the west edge of the community, leading north  to Williston and south  to Dunnellon.

Demographics

References

Census-designated places in Levy County, Florida
Census-designated places in Florida
Former municipalities in Florida